The Mixed Doubles tournament of the 2013 BWF World Junior Championships was held from October 29 until November 3. Edi Subaktiar and Melati Daeva Oktaviani from Indonesia won the tournament last year.

This year, Chinese pair Huang Kaixiang / Chen Qingchen took the gold medal, beating The Indonesian's Kevin Sanjaya Sukamuljo and Masita Mahmudin by 21-18, 20-22, 23-21 in the thriller and classic final match that ended after about an hour.

Seeded

  Choi Sol-kyu / Chae Yoo-jung (semi-final)
  Liu Yuchen / Huang Dongping (semi-final)
  Huang Kaixiang / Chen Qingchen (champion)
  Kim Jung-ho / Kim Hye-rin (fourth round)
  Chua Khek Wei / Yap Cheng Wen (second round)
  Dechapol Puavaranukroh / Puttita Supajirakul (quarter-final)
  Tang Chun Man / Ng Wing Yung (fourth round)
  Alexandr Zinchenko / Olga Morozova (fourth round)
  Ruben Jille / Alida Chen (second round)
  Thanadol Jumpanoi / Ruethaichanok Laisuan (third round)
  Kim Jae-hwan / Kim Ji-won (third round)
  Iikka Heino / Mathilda Lindholm (second round)
  Frederik Sogaard Mortensen / Maiken Fruergaard (fourth round)
  Fabian Roth / Jennifer Karnott (fourth round)
  Marvin Seidel / Lara Kaepplein (third round)
  Kevin Sanjaya Sukamuljo / Masita Mahmudin (final)

Draw

Finals

Top Half

Section 1

Section 2

Section 3

Section 4

Bottom Half

Section 5

Section 6

Section 7

Section 8

References
Main Draw (Archived 2013-10-29)

Mixed
World Junior